Meroptera is a genus of snout moths. It was described by Augustus Radcliffe Grote in 1882.

Species
 Meroptera abditiva Heinrich, 1956
 Meroptera anaimella A. Blanchard & Knudson, 1985
 Meroptera cviatella Dyar, 1905
 Meroptera mirandella Ragonot, 1893
 Meroptera nevadensis Neunzig, 2003
 Meroptera pravella (Grote, 1878)

References

Phycitinae